Víctor Hugo Dorrego Coito (born 9 May 1993) is an Uruguayan footballer who plays as a midfielder for Cerro Largo.

References

External links

1993 births
Living people
Footballers from Montevideo
Association football midfielders
Uruguayan footballers
Uruguay youth international footballers
Uruguay under-20 international footballers
Club Nacional de Football players
C.A. Rentistas players
Deportivo Maldonado players
Cerro Largo F.C. players
Rampla Juniors players
Uruguayan Primera División players
Uruguayan Segunda División players